FC Twente3 IL is an American women's soccer team, founded in 2006. The team is a member of the Women's Premier Soccer League, the third tier of women's soccer in the United States and Canada. The team plays in the Midwest Conference.

The team plays its home games at Hoyne Field of Loyola University in Chicago, Illinois. The club's colors are red, white and black.

Players

Current roster

Notable former players

Year-by-year

Honors

Competition History

Coaches
  Richard Drake 2007–present

Stadia
 Hoyne Field, Chicago, Illinois 2007–present

Average Attendance

External links
 Official Site
 WPSL FC Twente3 IL page

Women's Premier Soccer League teams
Women's soccer clubs in Chicago
2006 establishments in Illinois
Association football clubs established in 2006